The following is a list of the television networks and announcers who have broadcast college football's Music City Bowl throughout the years.

Television

2020s

2010s

2000s

1990s

Radio

2020s

2010s

2000s

1990s

References

Music City
Broadcasters
Music City Bowl
Music City Bowl